KGSP started in 1974, at 90.3 at 10 watts. It's studios were in the co-ed dorm, New Hall back then, Chestnut today. Around 1976, the studios were moved to Copley Thaw Hall, still at 90.3  at 10 watts. The format when they were in the dorm was rock and roll, when it moved to Copley, they changed to a jazz format.The music was all on LP records and Park was a College then.  Sometime after 1978, the College became a University, and the radio station was allowed a power increase to the present level (in the sidebar), but still at 90.3  Sometime after this, an interference complaint from another radio station at 90.3 in Kansas came up. KGSP was moved to the present 90.5. 

KGSP (90.5 FM, "Pirate Radio") is a part-time radio station  broadcasting a variety music format. Licensed to Parkville, Missouri, United States, the station is currently owned by the Board of Trustees, Park University.

References

External links
Official website

GSP
GSP